Angela Voigt, née Schmalfeld (18 May 1951 – 11 April 2013) was an East German long jumper.

Biography
Voigt was born in Weferlingen, in what was then East Germany, on 18 May 1951. She was originally a pentathlete, and finished third and second at the East German championships in 1972 and 1973. Because of injuries she eventually concentrated on the long jump only. She finished fourth at the 1974 European Championships. Voigt set a long jump world record of 6.92 metres at Dresden on 9 May 1976  but it was broken ten days later by Siegrun Siegl.  At the 1976 Montreal Olympics Siegl finished fourth while Voigt won the gold with a leap of 6.72 metres. Kathy McMillan, who eventually finished second, had a longer jump which was deemed a foul.

At the 1978 European Championships Voigt won a silver medal, having given birth to a son the previous year. 6.92 m remained her career best jump, and today this places her ninth on the German all-time performers list, behind Heike Drechsler, Helga Radtke, Sabine Paetz, Brigitte Wujak, Birgit Großhennig, Susen Tiedtke, Siegrun Siegl and Christine Schima. She competed for the sports club SC Magdeburg during her active career and retired in 1982. On 11 April 2013, she died following a short, severe illness.

References

External links

1951 births
2013 deaths
East German female long jumpers
Athletes (track and field) at the 1976 Summer Olympics
Olympic athletes of East Germany
Olympic gold medalists for East Germany
World record setters in athletics (track and field)
European Athletics Championships medalists
Medalists at the 1976 Summer Olympics
Olympic gold medalists in athletics (track and field)
Sportspeople from Saxony-Anhalt
People from Bezirk Magdeburg